Malakpet railway station is a railway station in Hyderabad, Telangana, India. Localities like Chaderghat, Nalgonda 'X' Roads, Dilsukhnagar and Kothapet are accessible from this station.

Lines
Hyderabad Multi-Modal Transport System
Secunderabad–Falaknuma route (SF Line)

Gallery

External links

MMTS Timings as per South Central Railway

MMTS stations in Hyderabad
Hyderabad railway division